Kelly Bailey is a composer, musician, programmer and sound designer. He was the senior game designer of sound and music at Valve until he left in 2011 with Mike Dussault to concentrate on their project, Sunspark Labs LLC. Valve composer Mike Morasky mentioned in February 2014 that Bailey had returned to Valve, but in a February 2016 article on Forbes it was reported that Bailey has founded his own company, IndiMo Labs, and that he is no longer with Valve.

Biography 
On the defunct Half-Life website, his function was described as follows: "Kelly did all of the music and sound effects for Half-Life, and wrote sound code to create character speech and DSP reverb effects."

On Valve's official website circa 1998, his function was described as follows: "Kelly, formerly a product unit manager at Microsoft, has a programming background that includes consumer multimedia, database engines, and networking. He created all the music and sound effects for Half-Life."

In addition to composing the soundtrack for Half-Life 2, Bailey was one of four Valve employees – the others being David Speyrer, Eric Kirchmer, and Greg Coomer – who served as facial models for Gordon Freeman's face in the game's promotional materials.

On Valve's official website circa 2010, his function was described as follows: "Kelly is Valve's senior audio producer, responsible for creating sound effects & music."

Around March 2011, Kelly Bailey left Valve with colleague Mike Dussault to work on their project Sunspark Labs LLC, launched in December 2010, developing iOS applications, their first being "Morfo", released in June 2011. The news caused some concern and displeasure from the Steam community due to the lack of any public farewell or notification regarding Bailey's departure. However, at a press conference in February 2014, Mike Morasky (the current composer at Valve), stated that Kelly Bailey was working with Valve again.

On 24 September 2015, a collection of new music composed by Bailey was released as a custom music kit in Counter-Strike: Global Offensive titled Hazardous Environments. The music kit's description states that it was "inspired by the darker side of the Half-Life universe".

On 18 March 2016, Forbes wrote that Bailey is no longer with Valve but that he has created his own video game company, IndiMo Labs, and that he had been spending sixteen hours a day for the previous seven months as the sole developer behind Vanishing Realms: Rite of Steel, a virtual reality video game with RPG elements for the HTC Vive. The game released as an early access title on Steam on 5 April 2016, the same day the HTC Vive was launched.

On 22 January 2020, Valve employee David Feise stated in a Reddit AMA that Mike Morasky, the sole composer of the then-upcoming Half-Life: Alyx, had consulted Bailey about his approach to the music of the Half-Life series and would likely honor his advice when composing the music for Alyx.

Discography

Video games 
 Half-Life (1998)
 Half-Life 2 (2004)
 Half-Life 2: Episode One (2006)
 Half-Life 2: Episode Two (2007)
 Portal (2007)
  Portal 2 (2011)
 Counter-Strike: Global Offensive (additional music, 2015)
 Vanishing Realms: Rite of Steel (2016)

References 

Year of birth missing (living people)
Living people
Valve Corporation people
Video game composers
Video game designers
Sound designers